Trung Le Nguyen (born June 2, 1990), also known as Trungles, is a Vietnamese-American cartoonist. He is best known as the author of the graphic novel The Magic Fish, published by Random House Graphic in 2020.

Biography

Early life and career
Trung Le Nguyen was born in a Vietnamese refugee camp in the Philippines and moved to the United States as a child in 1992. He began drawing comics in middle school but gave up the pastime in college, stating, "I never really thought to make it a career. It always seemed like this fluffy way for me to pass the time." He graduated from Hamline University with a bachelor's degree in studio art with a minor in art history in 2012. Originally planning to pursue a career in arts administration, he instead chose to pursue a career in comics. Nguyen's art is noted for its use of traditional inking and penciling and references to Vietnamese imagery, shōjo manga, and classic children's literature. He cites Rose O'Neill, Heinrich Lefler, and Harry Clarke among his influences.

In 2017, Nguyen was a jurist for the Ignatz Awards. Also in 2017 his coloring book Fauns & Fairies was published by Oni Press under their erotic comics imprint Limerence Press. In 2018, he was an artist on the Image Comics romance comics anthology Twisted Romance, written by Alex de Campi. In October 2020, Random House Graphic published Nguyen's debut graphic novel The Magic Fish. The series, which follows a young Vietnamese gay immigrant and his parents who bond and learn English through fairy tale books, was inspired by Nguyen's upbringing.

Personal life
Nguyen is gay, non-binary, and uses pronouns he/they. He resides in Minneapolis, Minnesota.

Selected bibliography
 The Magic Fish (Random House Graphic, 2020)
 Star Spinner Tarot (Chronicle Books, 2020)
 Twisted Romance #4 (Image Comics, 2018)
 Adventure Time Marshall Lee Spectacular (Boom! Studios, 2018)
 Fauns & Fairies: The Adult Fantasy Coloring Book (Limerence Press, 2017)

Accolades
Nguyen was nominated for a 2021 Eisner Award for Best Writer/Artist. The Magic Fish won two 2021 Harvey Awards for Book of the Year and Best Children or Young Adult Book. It was also named a top book on the American Library Association's Rainbow List in 2021, and was selected as one of the best books of 2020 by The Globe and Mail, the New York Public Library, and Nerdist.

References

External links
 

1990 births
American comics artists
American people of Vietnamese descent
American gay artists
Hamline University alumni
LGBT comics creators
Living people
People from Palawan
People from Minneapolis